The Bald Hill Lithium and Tantalum Mine is a lithium mine in Australia. It was closed, but is being re-opened for tantalum production. It previously was operated as a tantalum mine by Haddington International Resources. The mine comprises approximately 774 square kilometres in Western Australia's Eastern Goldfields Coolgardie Municipal area. It is located approximately 60 kilometres south east of Kambalda and around 50 kilometres east of Widgiemooltha.

In 2019 Bald Hill Lithium and Tantalum Mine was funded to production with existing lithium offtake agreements in place with a Hong-Kong based company, Burwill Holdings Limited.

The mine ceased production in late 2019.

Ownership 

The Bald Hill Lithium and Tantalum Mine was jointly owned by Tawana Resources and Alliance Mineral Assets Limited. Tawana and Alliance Mineral Assets Limited merged in a $446 million merger in 2018. The combined company initially trades as Alliance Mineral Assets, but changed its name to Alita Resources in July 2019. Administrators were appointed in August 2019. The company failed when the mine continued to operate but the offtake partner stopped accepting shipments.

As of 2022, the mine is owned by Lithco No.2 Pty Ltd which, in turn, is indirectly fully owned by Alita Resources. Lithco secured a US$30 million loan from Yihe Cleantech Material Limited for the purpose of resuming operations at the mine in March 2022.

Reserves and resources 

The increased reserve now underpinning an initial nine-year mine life. Additionally, with the ongoing infill drilling program, further upgrades are targeted for later this year.

References

External links 
 MINEDEX website: Bald Hill Database of the Department of Mines, Industry Regulation and Safety

Lithium mines in Australia
Tantalum mines in Australia
Mines in Western Australia
Shire of Coolgardie